Efstrat Billa (born 13 June 1980, in Vlorë) is a retired Albanian football player. He has played for Albania national team.

International career
He made his debut for Albania in an October 2003 friendly match against Portugal in Lisbon and earned a total of 2 caps, scoring no goals. His other international game was a November 2003 friendly match against Estonia. In both games he came on as a sub for Foto Strakosha.

National team statistics

Coaching career
In January 2014, Billa was appointed goalkeeper coach of Kukësi.

References

External links

1980 births
Living people
Footballers from Vlorë
Albanian footballers
Association football goalkeepers
Albania international footballers
Flamurtari Vlorë players
Atromitos F.C. players
FK Partizani Tirana players
KS Egnatia Rrogozhinë players
KS Shkumbini Peqin players
A.P.O. Akratitos Ano Liosia players
KF Skënderbeu Korçë players
KF Gramshi players
Kategoria Superiore players
Super League Greece players
Albanian expatriate footballers
Expatriate footballers in Greece
Albanian expatriate sportspeople in Greece